Christian Ramota (born 14 April 1973) is a former German team handball player (goalkeeper). He received a silver medal at the 2004 Summer Olympics in Athens with the German national team. He is also European champion from 2004, and received a silver medal at the 2003 World Championship.

References

External links 
 
 
 

1973 births
Living people
German male handball players
Olympic handball players of Germany
Olympic silver medalists for Germany
Olympic medalists in handball
Handball players at the 2004 Summer Olympics
Medalists at the 2004 Summer Olympics